The coussin de Lyon is a sweet specialty of Lyon, France, composed of chocolate and marzipan and created by Voisin, a French chocolatier. This tidbit is a piece of pale green marzipan, with dark green stripe, filled with a chocolate ganache flavored with curaçao liqueur.

History
During the plague epidemic in 1643, the aldermen of Lyon made the vow to organize a procession at Fourvière to implore the Virgin Mary to save the city. They carried a  wax candle and a gold crown on a silk cushion. This gave the chocolatier Voisin, based in Lyon since 1897, the idea of using the shape of the cushion to create this confection in 1960. It has become the most popular French specialty confection containing chocolate ganache.

This delicacy has become very popular. It is possible to buy the "cushions" individually, and also in velvet boxes which recall the original form of silk cushion.

The Boucaud family has a monopoly in marketing the coussins, which it makes in its network of retail stores across the Rhône-Alpes region and in Marseille. In 2010 company manager, Paul Boucaud, said that Voisin manufactures annually  of coussins in Lyon and that production increases by 10% year on year. The family does not use large retailers to market its product.

See also

Lyonnaise cuisine
 List of pastries

References

External links
 Official site of Voisin society

French pastries
French confectionery
Cuisine of Auvergne-Rhône-Alpes
Chocolate
Marzipan